WTPR may refer to:

 WTPR (AM), a radio station (710 AM) licensed to Paris, Tennessee, United States
 WTPR-FM, a radio station (101.7 FM) licensed to McKinnon, Tennessee, United States